Chandrakant Jadhav (20 September 1964 – 21 November 2021) was an Indian politician. He served as Member of Maharashtra Legislative Assembly from Kolhapur North from 2019 to his death in November 2021, from post Covid-19 complications, representing Indian National Congress. After his death his wife Jayshri Jadhav was elected as an MLA of Kolhapur North.

References 

1964 births
2021 deaths
Maharashtra MLAs 2019–2024
People from Kolhapur
Indian National Congress politicians from Maharashtra
People from Kolhapur district
Deaths from the COVID-19 pandemic in India